Gionata Mingozzi (29 December 1984 – 15 July 2008) was an Italian footballer. He last played for Treviso in Serie B.

Career
Mingozzi started his career at Ravenna. He followed the team promoted from Eccellenza to Serie C2 within 2 years. He was signed by Perugia in summer 2004.

In summer 2005, he was signed by Sampdoria and made his Serie A debut on 26 February 2006 against Siena.

He was successively loaned to Lecce, and sold half of contractual rights to Treviso in summer 2007.

Mingozzi died in a car accident when his Porsche hit directly a lorry in Campagna Lupia on 15 July 2008.

References

External links
 His career profile (from La Gazzetta dello Sport)

1984 births
2008 deaths
Italian footballers
Sportspeople from Ravenna
Serie A players
Ravenna F.C. players
A.C. Perugia Calcio players
U.C. Sampdoria players
U.S. Lecce players
Treviso F.B.C. 1993 players
Association football midfielders
Road incident deaths in Italy
Footballers from Emilia-Romagna